Subri Lake, also known as Langarpura Lake, is located 10 km Southeast of Muzaffarabad in Azad Kashmir, Pakistan. The lake is formed where the Jhelum River widens.

This lake is accessible by Muzaffarabad-Chakothi road.

See also 
List of lakes in Pakistan

References

Lakes of Azad Kashmir